K. Amarnath Ramakrishna is an Indian archaeologist. He is noted for his research into the Keeladi excavation site, a Sangam period settlement in Tamil Nadu. Ramakrishna also worked in Kondapur and Nagarjunakonda museums.

See also
Indian Archaeological Society
Tamil Nadu Archaeology Department
Keezhadi

References

20th-century Indian archaeologists
Living people
Archaeologists of South Asia
Year of birth missing (living people)